The LG Optimus Zip (also known as the LG Enlighten for Verizon and the LG Eclypse in Canada) is an Android-powered cellphone developed by LG Electronics, Inc. It was first released on September 22, 2011 on Verizon Wireless in the United States.

Variants

LG Enlighten
In the United States, Verizon Wireless was the first carrier to sell the phone.

LG Eclypse
In Canada, the LG Eclypse C800G was released on December 12, 2011 for Bell Mobility and Virgin Mobile Canada.  The touchscreen is slightly bigger at 3.5 inches, and the digital camera has a higher resolution of 5 megapixels and HD 720p video recording.  It is also an HSPA+ device, supporting download speeds of up to 14.4 Mbit/s.

See also
Galaxy Nexus
List of Android devices

References

Android (operating system) devices
Optimus Zip
Mobile phones introduced in 2011